Far East is a 1982 Australian drama film directed by John Duigan and starring Bryan Brown, Helen Morse and John Bell. Far East has many similarities to the 1942 classic Casablanca.

Filmink said it was "Part of Australian cinema’s (brief as it turned out) interest in Asia in the early '80s."

Plot
Journalist Peter Reeves (John Bell) takes his wife Jo (Helen Morse) to the Far East. There they meet Morgan Keefe (Bryan Brown), an ex-pat Aussie who owns a sleazy bar/nightspot called "The Koala Klub". After renewing their romance, Jo seeks Morgan's help when her husband is persecuted by the military regime for his investigations.

Cast
Bryan Brown as Morgan Keefe
Helen Morse as Jo Reeves
John Bell as Peter Reeves
Raina McKeon as Rosita Constanza
Henry Duvall as Rodolfo De Cruz
Sinan Leong as Nene
Bill Hunter as Walker
John Clayton as Tony Alsop
Louise Pajo as Shirley
Duc Sanh Lieu as Kip
Anna Rowena as Julia

Production
The original script was about an international business conference in the Philippines where members of the Philippines New Army surrounded them. But then the story drifted to more of a Casablanca (1943) type tale. Macao was used for eight days of location shooting.

Awards
John Bell was nominated at the 1982 AFI Awards in the Best Actor in a Supporting Role category.

Box office
Far East grossed $1,972,000 at the box office in Australia.

Home Media
Far East was released on DVD with a new print by Umbrella Entertainment in April 2012. The DVD is compatible with all region codes and includes special features such as the theatrical trailer and audio commentary with director John Duigan.

See also
Cinema of Australia

References

Further reading

External links

Far East at Oz Movies
Far East at the NFSA

1982 films
Australian drama films
1980s English-language films
1982 drama films
Films directed by John Duigan
Films set in the Philippines
Films shot in Macau
Films shot in the Philippines
1980s Australian films